Eurytellina is a genus of bivalves belonging to the family Tellinidae.

The species of this genus are found in Southern Asia and America.

Species:

Eurytellina alternata 
Eurytellina angulosa 
Eurytellina eburnea 
Eurytellina gibber 
Eurytellina hertleini 
Eurytellina hiberna 
Eurytellina inaequistriata 
Eurytellina laceridens 
Eurytellina lineata 
Eurytellina nitens 
Eurytellina prora 
Eurytellina punicea 
Eurytellina regia 
Eurytellina rubescens 
Eurytellina simulans 
Eurytellina solitaria 
Eurytellina tayloriana 
Eurytellina trinitatis 
Eurytellina vespuciana

References

Tellinidae
Bivalve genera